A special election was held in  and s September 11-13, 1804 to fill a vacancy in the 9th Congress left by Representative-elect Daniel D. Tompkins (DR) resigning to accept an appointment to the New York Supreme Court.

At the time, the 2nd and 3rd districts had combined returns, functioning as a single plural district, hence, both Tompkins' initial election and this special election covered both districts.

Election returns

Mumford took his seat with the rest of the 9th Congress at the start of the 1st session.

See also
List of special elections to the United States House of Representatives

References

New York 1804 02
New York 1804 02
1804 02
New York 02
United States House of Representatives 02
United States House of Representatives 1804 02 03